The International Emmy Award for Best Telenovela is presented by the International Academy of Television Arts & Sciences (IATAS) and recognizes excellence in telenovelas produced and initially aired outside of the United States. The first International Emmy for telenovela was presented at the 36th International Emmy Awards Gala in 2008 in New York City.

History 
The category was created in 2008 by the board of the International Academy of Television Arts and Sciences in order to honor telenovelas which have been produced and broadcast initially outside the United States. Until 2007, telenovelas received nominations in the best drama series category of the international competition, such as Sinhá Moça (2006), which was the first telenovela nominated for an Emmy.

Brazil's Globo is the TV network with the largest number of nominations, 12 in total, winning in 2009, 2012, 2013, 2014, 2015, 2016 and 2020. In addition to a co-production in 2011 with the Portuguese network SIC, for Laços de Sangue.

Considered the most prominent event in the international television industry, the International Emmy Awards recognizes excellence in television produced outside of the United States, as well as US Primetime programs produced in languages other than English.

Rules and regulations 
The International Emmy for Best Telenovela awards a melodramatic production with a continuous storyline and a duration with at least half an hour televised counting with 50 and 220 episodes. The Telenovela usually has to air 2 and 6 times a week, generally having the genre romance as the central theme.

Winners and nominees

2000s

2010s

2020s

Multiple nominations and wins

See also

References

External links
 2013 Emmy Awards
 International Emmy Awards

 
Telenovela
Soap opera awards